Neoporteria may refer to:

 the cactus genus Eriosyce
 the Amaurobiidae spider genus Neoporteria (spider)